The Amsterdamse Bos (English: Amsterdam Forest) is an English park or landscape park in the municipalities of Amstelveen and Amsterdam. Although most of the park is located in Amstelveen, the owner of the park is the City of Amsterdam. The park was mainly built in the early 1930s, mostly by the unemployment relief. Because of World War II interrupting the building process, the last tree was not planted until the 1970s. It houses a number of animal parks, sporting clubs, rowing courses, gardens and remembrance monuments.

Throughout the decades, the location has seen different gatherings, political manifestations and (i.a., free) concerts. These often took place on the so-called Vietnam Meadow. Despite extensive protests, this part was turned into a tennis venue in 1994.

The park is bisected (but can not be reached by) the A9 motorway.

Amenities

Bosbaan 
An important part of the park is the rowing course called de Bosbaan ("Forest course"), which was opened in 1937. The course was an alternative for rowing on the Amstel river, or on the canal surrounding the polder of the Haarlemmermeer, which were the two traditional locations for rowing competition. It is the world's oldest artificial rowing course. In 1977 it hosted the World Rowing championships. In order to meet international competition regulation, the Bosbaan was widened to 118 meters (8 lanes for competition and an additional preparation lane). In 2014 the Bosbaan hosted the World Rowing Championship for a second time.

Recreational areas 
There are several open areas and meadows within the forest. Some of which are located along an artificial beach along ponds and have sanitary, food and children's play facilities for summertime recreation. One of the open areas is bordered by a man-made hill. The area of the park called Zonneweide is an area designated for naturist recreation.

Swimming 
There are several ponds and streams that can be used for swimming. There is a sand beach along a part of Grote Vijver pond. Weather conditions permitting, the water in the Groot Kinderbad children's paddling pool is activated from May until September.

Farms 
Geitenboerderij Riddammerhoeve is a goat farm. Next to offering simple food dishes and making goat milk-based dairy products on site, it offers a petting zoo with goats, a playground and a maze.

Boerderij Meerzicht features a pancake restaurant and deer watching.

Open air theatre 
In the open air Amsterdamse Bos Theater paid concerts and plays are held during the Summer period.

Scottish Highlanders 
To combat the forestation in some areas, Scottish Highland cattle have been placed in the park. Locked in the area by cattle grids, they make sure the meadow doesn't grow to become a forest while remaining a natural look that could not be achieved by mowing.

Rental facilities 
Canoes, kayaks and bicycles can be rented at several locations.

Camping 
At the Day Camping people can put up a tent for a day. For longer stays there is Camping Amsterdamse Bos, a campsite that rents out sites for tents, caravans, campervans and has campsite facilities. It is not permitted to stay the night and sleep anywhere else in the forest.

Image gallery

References

External links

Live weather in Amsterdamse Bos

See also 
 Jakoba Mulder (1900 – 1988), park architect and urban planner

Forests of the Netherlands
Parks in Amsterdam
Nude beaches